Lost in Love may refer to:

Film and TV
"Lost in Love", a two-part episode of Degrassi: The Next Generation
Lost in Love (film), a 2006 South Korean film directed by Choo Chang-min

Music

Albums
Lost in Love (Freda Payne album), 2000
Lost in Love (Air Supply album), 1980
Lost In Love (Younha album), 2010

Songs
"Lost in Love" (Air Supply song), 1980
"Lost in Love" (Demis Roussos song), 1980
"Lost in Love" (New Edition song), 1985
"Lost in Love", a 1978 song by Robin Trower from Caravan to Midnight
"Lost in Love", a 2003 song by Kym Marsh from "Cry"
"Lost in Love", a 2008 song by Melissa Smith featured in Command Performance